The 2011 NZIHL season was the seventh season of the New Zealand Ice Hockey League, the top level of ice hockey in New Zealand. Five teams participated in the league, and the Botany Swarm won the championship by defeating the Southern Stampede in the final.

Regular season

Final
Botany Swarm – Southern Stampede 5:3

External links
 New Zealand Ice Hockey League official site

Seasons in New Zealand ice hockey
New Zealand Ice Hockey League seasons
Ice
New